Košecké Podhradie is a village and municipality in Ilava District in the Trenčín Region of north-western Slovakia.

History
In historical records the village was first mentioned in 1312.

Geography
The municipality lies at an altitude of 330 metres and covers an area of 36.915 km². It has a population of about 1071 people.

References

External links

  Official page
https://web.archive.org/web/20090412234949/http://www.statistics.sk/mosmis/eng/run.html
 Podhradska dolina (Valey) and Photo Gallery surroundings of the village Košecké Podhradie

Villages and municipalities in Ilava District